Mobridge also Kȟowákataŋ Otȟúŋwahe (Lakota: Kȟowákataŋ Otȟúŋwahe; lit. "Over-the-River Town") is a city in Walworth County, South Dakota, United States. The population was 3,261 according to the 2020 census.

History

Located in territory that had long been occupied by the Lakota Sioux, Mobridge was founded by European Americans in 1906 following construction of the Chicago, Milwaukee, St. Paul and Pacific Railroad through here. The town was named Mobridge for its railroad designation, a contracted form of Missouri Bridge, after the original railroad bridge over the Missouri River.  The bridge was demolished by the Corps of Engineers in the early 1960s and replaced by a higher bridge due to the construction of the Oahe Dam.

There are disputed claims that some or all of chief Sitting Bull's remains were moved by his surviving relatives and the Dakota Memorial Association on April 8, 1953 from Fort Yates, North Dakota, where he had been killed and buried, to Mobridge, which was near his birthplace. The Mobridge burial site is marked by a monument consisting of his bust on a granite pedestal; it overlooks the Missouri River.  It was dedicated by the Dakota Memorial Association on April 11, 1953.

The Brown Palace Hotel in Mobridge is listed on the U.S. National Register of Historic Places.  Artist Oscar Howe (Yanktonai Dakota) painted a mural for the town's auditorium.

The Mobridge Masonic Temple was built in Egyptian Revival style in 1923.

Geography

Mobridge has been assigned the ZIP code 57601 and the FIPS place code 43180.

Climate

Notes

Demographics

2010 census
As of the census of 2010, there were 3,465 people, 1,514 households, and 898 families living in the city. The racial makeup of the city was 75.7% White, 0.2% African American, 20.5% Native American, 0.4% Asian, 0.2% from other races, and 3.1% from two or more races. Hispanic or Latino of any race were 0.8% of the population.

There were 1,514 households, of which 27.7% had children under the age of 18 living with them, 43.5% were married couples living together, 11.2% had a female householder with no husband present, 4.6% had a male householder with no wife present, and 40.7% were non-families. 34.9% of all households were made up of individuals, and 16.6% had someone living alone who was 65 years of age or older. The average household size was 2.22 and the average family size was 2.86.

The median age in the city was 44 years. 23.6% of residents were under the age of 18; 7.3% were between the ages of 18 and 24; 20% were from 25 to 44; 26.2% were from 45 to 64; and 22.9% were 65 years of age or older. The gender makeup of the city was 48.1% male and 51.9% female.

2000 census
As of the census of 2000, there were 3,574 people, 1,545 households, and 948 families living in the city. The population density was 2,009.4 people per square mile (775.2/km2). There were 1,808 housing units at an average density of 1,016.5 per square mile (392.2/km2). The racial makeup of the city was 79.52% White, 0.03% African American, 18.13% Native American, 0.22% Asian, 0.06% Pacific Islander, 0.08% from other races, and 1.96% from two or more races. 0.84% of the population is Hispanic or Latino of any race.

There were 1,545 households, out of which 26.4% had children under the age of 18 living with them, 46.5% were married couples living together, 11.5% had a female householder with no husband present, and 38.6% were non-families. 35.1% of all households were made up of individuals, and 17.8% had someone living alone who was 65 years of age or older. The average household size was 2.24 and the average family size was 2.88.

In the city, the population was spread out, with 24.3% under the age of 18, 7.4% from 18 to 24, 22.8% from 25 to 44, 23.2% from 45 to 64, and 22.3% who were 65 years of age or older. The median age was 41 years. For every 100 females, there were 89.6 males. For every 100 females age 18 and over, there were 85.1 males.

As of 2000 the median income for a household in the city was $25,583, and the median income for a family was $31,026. Males had a median income of $22,727 versus $16,990 for females. The per capita income for the city was $14,921. About 18.1% of families and 21.6% of the population were below the poverty line, including 32.2% of those under age 18 and 15.4% of those age 65 or over.

Media

AM Radio

FM Radio

Television
 KBME-TV Ch. 3 PBS (PPT)
 KPRY-TV Ch. 4 ABC/CW+ (Pierre)
 KFYR-TV Ch. 5 NBC/Fox (Bismarck)
 KPLO-TV Ch. 6 CBS/MyNetworkTV (Reliance–Pierre)
 KQSD-TV Ch. 11 PBS (SDPB)
 KXMB-TV Ch. 12 CBS/CW+ (Bismarck)

Newspaper
 Mobridge Tribune

Government
Mobridge uses a city council consisting of seven council members including the mayor. As of March 2020, the current mayor is Gene Cox.

Notable people
James R. Carrigan, United States District Court judge and Colorado Supreme Court justice
Bill Mott, National Museum of Racing and Hall of Fame thoroughbred trainer
Sitting Bull, Lakota Sioux leader.

See also
One World Direct

References

External links

Cities in South Dakota
Cities in Walworth County, South Dakota
South Dakota populated places on the Missouri River